Evelyn Rose Strange "Evie" Wyld  (born 16 June 1980) is an Anglo-Australian author. Her first novel, After the Fire, A Still Small Voice, won the John Llewellyn Rhys Prize in 2009, and her second novel, All the Birds, Singing, won the Encore Award in 2013 and the Miles Franklin Award in 2014. Her third novel, The Bass Rock, won the Stella Prize in 2021.

Early life and education
Born in London in 1980, Evie Wyld grew up on her grandparents' sugar cane farm in New South Wales, Australia, although she spent most of her adult life in Peckham, south London. In The Guardian she recounts how as a child she suffered from viral encephalitis.

She obtained a BA from Bath Spa University and an MA from Goldsmiths, University of London, both in Creative Writing.

Literary career
Wyld is the author of the John Llewellyn Rhys Prize and Betty Trask Award-winning novel After the Fire, A Still Small Voice and All the Birds, Singing. In 2010 she was listed by The Daily Telegraph as one of the 20 best British authors under the age of 40. In 2011 she was listed by the BBC's Culture Show as one of the 12 Best New British Writers. In 2013 she was included on the once a decade Granta Best of Young British Novelists List. Her novels have been shortlisted for the Costa Novel Prize, The Miles Franklin Award, the Commonwealth Writers Prize, the Orange Award for New Writers, the International IMPAC Dublin Literary Award, The Sky Arts Breakthrough Award, the James Tait Black Prize and The Author's Club Prize, and longlisted for the Stella Prize and the Baileys Women's Prize for Fiction.

She took over from Nii Parkes as Booktrust's online "Writer in Residence" in 2010, before passing the baton on to Polly Dunbar.

Her second novel, All the Birds, Singing, was published in February 2013 and concerns an Australian sheep farmer working on an English hill farm. The book won the 2014 Miles Franklin Award in June 2014.

Her third novel, The Bass Rock, was published by Jonathan Cape on March 26, 2020. Set in Scotland, it explores the lives of three women living in different centuries and the ways their lives are impacted by masculinity and male violence.

Personal life
Wyld currently lives in Brixton and works at an independent bookshop in Peckham. She married literary agent Jamie Coleman in July 2013.

Awards and honours
2013 Granta list of 20 best young writers
2013 Costa Book Awards (Novel) shortlisted for All the Birds, Singing
2013 Encore Award winner for All the Birds, Singing
2014 Miles Franklin Award winner for All the Birds, Singing
2014 European Union Prize for Literature, UK, All the Birds, Singing
2018 elected Fellow of the Royal Society of Literature in its "40 Under 40" initiative
2021 Christina Stead Prize for Fiction shortlisted for The Bass Rock
2021 Stella Prize winner for The Bass Rock
2022 Barbara Jefferis Award shortlisted for The Bass Rock

Bibliography

Short stories
"What will happen to the dog after we are dead?" (published in Goldfish: An Anthology of Writing from Goldsmiths)
"The Convalescent's Handbook" (online ) first published in Sea Stories, an anthology from the National Maritime Museum
"The Building Opposite" (appeared in 3:AM Magazine anthology London, New York, Paris)
"The Whales" (online) from Booktrust
"Menzies Meat" (online)
"Free Swim" (online )
"Six Degrees of Separation" (online )

Novels
After the Fire, A Still Small Voice (2009), winner of the John Llewellyn Rhys Prize and a Betty Trask Award.
All The Birds, Singing (2013)
The Bass Rock (2020)

References

External links
Official site
Twitter site
Interview: Evie Wyld : Working Writers
Savidge Reads Grills… Evie Wyld
11 May 2008|Interviews|Evie Wyld from Granta
Interview on YouTube about short story writing

1980 births
Living people
English women novelists
Writers from London
Alumni of Bath Spa University
Alumni of Goldsmiths, University of London
John Llewellyn Rhys Prize winners
Miles Franklin Award winners
English short story writers
British women short story writers
21st-century British novelists
21st-century English women writers
English people of Australian descent
People from Brixton
21st-century British short story writers
Fellows of the Royal Society of Literature
Australian expatriates in England